WBTO (1600 AM) was a radio station licensed to Linton, Indiana, United States.  According to FCC records, WBTO was first licensed in November 1953, and its license was cancelled at the request of the licensee in March 2011. The station was owned by The Original Company, Inc.

References

External links

BTO
Radio stations disestablished in 2011
Radio stations established in 1953
1953 establishments in Indiana
2011 disestablishments in Indiana
Defunct radio stations in the United States
BTO